The United States Department of Defense acknowledges holding Libyan detainees in Guantanamo. A total of 778 detainees have been held in extrajudicial detention in the Guantanamo Bay detention camps, in Cuba since the camps opened on January 11, 2002. The camp population peaked in 2004 at approximately 660. Hundreds of detainees were released without charges.

Following the United States Supreme Court's ruling in Rasul v. Bush (2004) that detainees had the right under habeas corpus to challenge their detention before an impartial tribunal, transfers to Guantanamo decreased.

Nineteen "high value detainees" have been transferred by the CIA to Guantanamo since September 2006, as the administration restricted their access to outside counsel and courts under the Military Commissions Act of 2006. This provision of the act was declared unconstitutional by the Supreme Court in Boumediene v. Bush (2008), which said detainees had the right of access to federal courts for habeas corpus challenges. As of February 24, 2010, the camp population stood at 188.

On February 24, 2010, Albania accepted the transfer of three former detainees, a Libyan, an Egyptian, and a Tunisian.

References

Lists of Guantanamo Bay detainees by nationality